Archaeological sites in Peru are numerous and diverse, representing different aspects including temples and fortresses of the various cultures of ancient Peru, such as the Moche and Nazca. The sites vary in importance from small local sites to UNESCO World Heritage sites of global importance. Their nature and complexity of the sites vary from small single-featured sites such as pyramids to entire cities, such as Chan Chan and Machu Picchu. Preservation and investigation of these sites are controlled mainly by the Culture Ministry (MINCUL). The lack of funding to protect sites and enforce existing laws, results in large scale looting and illegal trading of artifacts.

Sites

The following is an alphabetical list of archaeological sites in Peru, it lists the main archaeological sites of touristic importance as published by the Ministry of Foreign Commerce and Tourism.

See also
 Cultural periods of Peru
 List of pre-Columbian cultures

References

External links

  National Institute for Culture (INC)
  Archaeological sites in Peru
  Peruvian Archaeology News

 
Archaeological sites
Peru